Acidity regulators, or pH control agents, are food additives used to change or maintain pH (acidity or basicity). They can be organic or mineral acids, bases, neutralizing agents, or buffering agents.  Typical agents include the following acids and their sodium salts: sorbic acid, acetic acid, benzoic acid, and propionic acid. Acidity regulators are indicated by their E number, such as E260 (acetic acid), or simply listed as "food acid".

Acidity regulators differ from acidulants, which are often acidic but are added to confer sour flavors.  They are not intended to stabilize the food, although that can be a collateral benefit. Acidity regulators are also important for food safety, as incorrect pH can result in bacteria growth.

See also 
 Adipic acid
 List of food additives
 Sodium bicarbonate

References